Dogfish Bight is a bay in the U.S. state of Washington.

Dogfish Bight was so named on account of the stock of dogfish in the waters.

References

Landforms of Thurston County, Washington
Bays of Washington (state)